Robert Gilman Allen (July 10, 1867 – May 14, 1943) was an American shortstop for the Philadelphia Phillies, the Boston Beaneaters and the Cincinnati Reds, as well as a manager for two brief stints with the Phillies and Reds.

Early life
He was born in Marion, Ohio, and played youth baseball with future president Warren G. Harding.

Career

In 1894, he was struck in the face with a pitch, sustaining a broken cheekbone. The Chicago Tribune reported that cheekbone fragments had entered Allen's brain. The paper suggested that Allen had sustained permanent damage to his eyesight and his mind.

When Allen's contract was up, he took a three-year hiatus from baseball, but he later joined the Beaneaters. His playing time diminished and he walked away from baseball again after the 1897 season. In , he was hired as manager of the Reds, occasionally inserting himself into the game as a shortstop. He finished 62–77 and in seventh place.  He was fired after one season at the helm.

Later life 
He died in Little Rock, Arkansas, at age 75.

See also
List of Major League Baseball player–managers

References

External links

1867 births
1943 deaths
Philadelphia Phillies players
Boston Beaneaters players
Cincinnati Reds players
Philadelphia Phillies managers
Cincinnati Reds managers
Major League Baseball player-managers
Baseball players from Ohio
Major League Baseball shortstops
People from Marion, Ohio
Minor league baseball managers
Mansfield (minor league baseball) players
Minneapolis Millers (baseball) players
Davenport Hawkeyes players
Terre Haute (minor league baseball) players
Detroit Tigers (Western League) players
Indianapolis Hoosiers (minor league) players
19th-century baseball players